Because of You may refer to:

Music

Albums 
 Because of You (James Darren album), 2001
 Because of You (Ne-Yo album), 2007, and the title song (see below)
 Because of You (Tony Bennett album), 1952, and the title song, a cover of the popular song (see below)
 Neo Ttaemun-e (Because of You), a 2010 EP by After School, and the title song (see below)
 Because of You, a 1993 compilation album by Dexys Midnight Runners, and the title song (see below)
 Because of You, a 2003 album by The Kings
 Because of You, a 1998 album by Preservation Hall Jazz Band

Songs 
 "Because of You" (1940 song), a popular song by Arthur Hammerstein and Dudley Wilkinson, recorded by Tony Bennett and others
 "Because of You" (98 Degrees song), 1998
 "Because of You" (After School song)
 "Because of You" (The Cover Girls song)
 "Because of You" (Gabrielle song), 1994
 "Because of You" (Gustaph song), 2023
 "Because of You" (Kelly Clarkson song), 2005, recorded by herself with Reba McEntire
 "Because of You" (Marques Houston song)
 "Because of You" (Ne-Yo song), 2007
 "Because of You" (Nickelback song), 2004
 "Because of You", by 54-40 from Show Me
 "Because of You", by Arthur Hammerstein and Dudley Wilkinson, recorded by Connie Francis from One for the Boys
 "Because of You", by Ayumi Hamasaki from Memorial Address
 "Because of You", by Band of Susans from Love Agenda
 "Because of You", by Billie Piper from Walk of Life
 "Because of You", by Billy Ocean from Tear Down These Walls
 "Because of You", by Bobby Vinton from Bobby Vinton Sings the Big Ones
 "Because of You", by Dexys Midnight Runners, the theme for the 1986–1991 British sitcom Brush Strokes
 "Because of You", by DJ BoBo
 "Because of You", by Gene Clark from White Light
 "Because of You", by Jolin Tsai from 1019
 "Because of You", by Keith Martin from Love of My Life
 "Because of You", by Kyla from Not Your Ordinary Girl
 "Because of You", by Kym Marsh from Standing Tall
 "Because of You", by Letters to Cleo from Go!
 "Because of You", by Meat Loaf from Couldn't Have Said It Better
 "Because of You", by Skunk Anansie from Smashes and Trashes
 "Because of You", by Sleeper from Pleased to Meet You
 "Because of You", by Stephanie
 "Because of You", by Unwritten Law from Here's to the Mourning

Film and television 
 Because of You (1952 film), American film starring Loretta Young
 Because of You (2000 film), written and directed by Ryū Murakami
 Because of You (TV series), 2015 Philippine series
 Because of You (Taiwanese TV series), 2020 Taiwanese Taiwanese series

See also 
 All Because of You (disambiguation)